Bunama is an Austronesian language spoken in the D'Entrecasteaux Islands of Papua New Guinea.

Phonology

Consonants 

  can fluctuate to aspirated  in stressed syllables.
  can also be heard as  word-initially in stressed syllables.
  can be heard as a fricative  intervocalically in word-medial position.
  can be heard as a tap  intervocalically in word-medial position.
  can be heard as a more fronted  in unstressed syllables following vowels .
 Prevoicing of the lateral flap  may also occur in initial positions.
  may also be heard as a retroflex flap  depending on the dialect of the speaker. It can also be heard as  when realized as prevoiced in word-initial positions.
  may fluctuate to a labio-dental  among some speakers.
  may be realized as a dental approximant  when before .

Vowels 

  is heard as  before and after a labialized consonant, or with sounds , . It is also heard as  word-medially and word-finally in unstressed syllables.
  is heard as  word-medially and word-finally but never following labialized consonants, or semivowels . It is heard as  when following sounds .
  can be heard as  when preceding a glottal stop .

References 

Nuclear Papuan Tip languages
Languages of Milne Bay Province
D'Entrecasteaux Islands